Statistics of the Scottish Football League in season 1999–2000.

Scottish First Division

League table

Top scorers

Scottish Second Division

League table

Top scorers

Scottish Third Division

See also
1999–00 in Scottish football

References

 
Scottish Football League seasons